Street Without Joy or La Rue Sans Joie was the name given by troops of the French Far East Expeditionary Corps to the stretch of Route 1 from Huế to Quảng Trị during the First Indochina War.

Situation
The Viet Minh had fortified a string of villages along a line of sand dunes and salt marshes between Route 1 and the South China Sea and used these bases to launch ambushes on convoys passing on Route 1 and on the adjacent Hanoi-Saigon railway line which together formed the principal lines of communication between northern and southern Vietnam.

French colonial forces carried out a major attack on the Street Without Joy in Operation Camargue in July–August 1953.

The book
The area was made known to an English-speaking audience in the book Street Without Joy by Bernard B. Fall, first published in 1961. He described the terrain encountered by the French in Operation Camargue as follows:

Surroundings

On the land side, the "Street Without Joy" was preceded by another, less well-defined line of villages, the centre of which was Van Trinh. This was protected in turn by a vast zone of swamps, sand holes and quicksand bogs, extending all the way to Route 1. With an average width of about eight kilometers, it constitutes an almost impassable barrier to tanks and other motorized vehicles of the French Army, except on the few roads crossing it, which were, of course, heavily mined and sabotaged."

During the Vietnam War, the Street Without Joy again became a stronghold and base area for the Vietcong.

Deaths
In February 1967, the 9th Marine Regiment was conducting Operation Chinook II on the Street Without Joy. Bernard Fall was observing the operation when he was killed by a mine explosion.

During the First Battle of Quảng Trị in the Easter Offensive of 1972, People's Army of Vietnam forces fired indiscriminately on the intermingled South Vietnamese military and refugee columns fleeing south from Quảng Trị killing approximately 2,000 civilians in the Shelling of Highway 1.

References

External links 
 Map of the Street Without Joy (copyrighted)

Vietnam War sites
First Indochina War